Palencia Club de Fútbol is a Spanish football club based in Palencia, in the autonomous community of Castile and León. Founded on 5 March 2013, it plays in Tercera División RFEF – Group 8, holding home games at Estadio Nuevo La Balastera, with a capacity of 8,100 people.

History
Founded on 5 March 2013 as an immediate replacement to dissolved CF Palencia, the club was initially named Club Deportivo Atlético Palencia 1929. They proposed a merger with neighbors CD Cristo Atlético in May, but the move never materialized.

Initially assigned to the Primera Provincial de Aficionados, Atlético Palencia achieved promotion to the Primera Regional de Aficionados in 2015. In 2019, the club was renamed to Palencia Club de Fútbol, and achieved promotion to the Tercera División RFEF in 2021.

Season to season

1 season in Tercera División RFEF

Players

First team squad

References

External links
 
Fútbol Regional team profile 
Soccerway team profile

Football clubs in Castile and León
Association football clubs established in 2013
2013 establishments in Spain
Sport in Palencia